Saghang Sechen (1604 – after 1641) was an ethnic Mongol writer, historian and prince from the Borjigin clan.

Early life
He was a nephew of Altan Khan. When he was just 17, Saghang Sechen became a military and administrative aide to Ligden Khan. The latter entitled him .

Work

He is best known as the author of the Erdeni-yin tobchi (“Jeweled Summary”), which was published in 1662. The work is a history of the Mongol great Khans, and came as part of a struggle for unity among the Mongols, and renewal of their literature. It tells the story of the capture of Gürbeljin-gua ('Beautiful lizard'), queen of Tangut, whose husband (Tangut Khan) had been murdered by Genghis Khan after he destroyed their kingdom, the Tangut state. The story tells that before giving herself to Genghis Khan, she placed a pair of tweezers inside herself, which caused a fatal injury to Genghis Khan. She then drowned herself into the Yellow River. The work of Saghang Sechen has a strong folkloric note.

He further wrote biographies of Godan Khan, the grandson of Genghis Khan, and of Buddha.

Beside the literary value of his works, as an historian, he is said to have greatly contributed to the study of Mongol history.

Death
According to one source, he refused to become a subject of the Manchu of the Qing dynasty, and was sentenced to death by dismemberment.

References

Mongolian writers
17th-century writers
Mongolian nobility